The Russian ironclad Kreml was the third and last  broadside ironclad built for the Imperial Russian Navy during the mid-1860s. She joined the Baltic Fleet upon completion and accidentally sank a Russian frigate in 1869. The ship was assigned to the Gunnery Training Detachment in 1870 and was frequently rearmed. Kreml sank in shallow water after a storm in 1885; she was refloated and returned to service. The ship was placed in reserve in 1904 and disarmed the following year before being sold for scrap in 1908.

Design and description
The Pervenents-class ironclads were designed as coastal defence ships to protect the approaches to Saint Petersburg and were referred to as "self-propelled armored floating batteries". As such, heavy armament and protection were the most important factors in their design.

Displacing  at full load, she was somewhat larger than her half-sisters and displaced over  more. She was fitted with a ram bow and lacked the stern ram of her half-sisters. The ship did not steer well and historian Stephen McLaughlin notes that she had "an unpredictable habit of suddenly lurching to one side or another", probably as a result of poor water flow to the rudder. Kreml required six men to man her wheel and her total crew numbered 459 officers and enlisted men.

As a cost-cutting measure, the ship received the refurbished horizontal trunk steam engine from the wooden frigate , built by Carr and MacPherson of Saint Petersburg. Using steam produced by four rectangular fire-tube boilers to drive a single  propeller, the engine was designed to produce  and gave the ship a maximum speed of  during her sea trials on 18 October 1866. Kremls boilers proved to be unable to last more than about a decade in service before they had to be replaced, notably in 1876, 1886, 1892 and 1901. To save money, the replacement boilers were taken from retiring ships and reconditioned before installation in Kreml.

The ship was intended to be rigged as a three-masted schooner, like her half-sisters, but her first captain suggested that her fore- and mainmasts be square rigged to take advantage of her more seaworthy hull form. Kremls masts were hollow iron and were used to ventilate the lower decks, the first such masts in the Imperial Russian Navy. To protect her leadsmen, sailors who determined the depth of water under the keel, in combat, Kreml was fitted with two sounding tubes that led from the gun deck through the bottom of the hull.

Kreml was completed with 17 of the most powerful guns available to the Russians, the  60-pounder smoothbore gun. Fifteen were mounted on the broadside and two guns were placed in pivot mounts on the upper deck to serve as chase guns. Unfortunately, it proved to be incapable of penetrating  of wrought iron armor at a distance of only  during trials in 1859–60. Despite this, the ship continued to be armed with varying numbers of these guns, as well as  rifled guns throughout her career.

The ship's armor configuration differed from that of her half-sisters. The conning tower was also protected by 4.5 inches of armor. The ship's hull was divided by four watertight transverse and two longitudinal bulkheads for protection against underwater damage.

Construction and service
Kreml, named after the Kremlin, was ordered on 20 April 1863 when a contract was signed with the Russian shipbuilder Semiannikov & Poletika for a total cost of 898,000 rubles. Construction had not yet begun when the Russian Admiralty Board amended the contract on 20 July to shorten the construction time by one year for a payment of an extra 48,000 rubles in response to the adverse foreign reaction to the brutal Russian suppression of the revolts in Poland and Lithuania that year. Fearing attack by Britain and France, the Board switched priority to the smaller s shortly afterwards in the belief that they could be completed more quickly so that progress on Kreml slowed to a crawl once construction began on 2 October. The ship was not formally laid down until 23 December and she was launched on 26 August 1865.

The ship entered service in 1866 with the Baltic Fleet. Survivors were rescued by the four ships. Kreml was only slightly damaged. She was assigned to the Gunnery Training Detachment in March 1870 and remained with it for the bulk of her career. In November 1881, the steam-powered steering gear taken from the ironclad  was installed which required the installation of a high-pressure donkey boiler in the cramped boiler room. This proved to be more trouble than it was worth and was removed two years later. Kreml was caught by a storm on 10 June 1885 while sailing for Reval and began taking on so much water that her captain decided to make for shallow water; she reached Kunda Bay, on the Estonian coast, under sail alone after her engine bearings overheated and forced the engine to be stopped. Kreml was refloated on five days later and repaired in Kronstadt. She was reclassified as coast-defense ironclad on 13 February 1892 and placed in reserve on 24 December 1904. Kreml was disarmed and turned over to the Port of Kronstadt for disposal on 15 September 1905. She was stricken from the Navy List on 12 October and sold for scrap on 8 September 1908.

Notes

Footnotes

References

Further reading

Naval ships of Russia
1865 ships
Ironclad warships of the Imperial Russian Navy
Ships built in Saint Petersburg
Maritime incidents in June 1885